William Leonard Pierro (April 15, 1926 – April 1, 2006), nicknamed "Wild Bill", was a pitcher in Major League Baseball. He played for the Pittsburgh Pirates.

References

External links

1926 births
2006 deaths
Bartlesville Oilers players
Bartlesville Pirates players
Baseball players from New York (state)
Major League Baseball pitchers
Pittsburgh Pirates players
Sportspeople from Brooklyn
Baseball players from New York City
Tallahassee Pirates players
Waco Pirates players